Appekunny Formation is a thick series of rock strata located in the Lewis Range within Glacier National Park, in the U.S. state of Montana. The formation is primarily mudstone and siltstone deposited in a shallow sea during the Proterozoic. Not far from the eastern entrance to the Going-to-the-Sun Road at St. Mary, Montana, the formation can be easily seen on the slopes of Singleshot Mountain. The Appekunny Formation contains bedding structures which may include the remains of the oldest metazoan (animal) on Earth known by the species name Horodyskia moniliformis.

The rock strata have been dated at between 1.2–1.4 billion years old.

References

Further reading
 
 

Glacier National Park (U.S.)
Geologic formations of Montana
Lewis Range